Eschweilera obversa is a species of woody plant in the family Lecythidaceae. It is endemic to the Amazon region in Brazil. It is threatened by habitat loss.

References

obversa
Endemic flora of Brazil
Flora of the Amazon
Conservation dependent plants
Near threatened flora of South America
Taxonomy articles created by Polbot